Sutton Maddock is a village and civil parish  south east of Shrewsbury, in the Shropshire district, in the county of Shropshire, England. The parish includes the hamlet of Brockton. In 2011 the parish had a population of 254. The parish touches Barrow, Beckbury, Broseley, The Gorge, Kemberton, Madeley, Ryton and Stockton.

Landmarks 
There are 5 listed buildings in Sutton Maddock. Sutton Maddock has a church called St Mary and a Shell service station.

History 
The name "Sutton" means 'south farm/settlement' and "Madoc" being the personal name of 3 generations of a family which held the manor in the 12th and 13th centuries. Sutton Maddock was recorded in the Domesday Book as Sudtone.

References

External links 
 Parish Council

Villages in Shropshire
Civil parishes in Shropshire